

Paintball
Paintball is a DC Comics supervillain who first appeared in Stars and S.T.R.I.P.E. #2 and was created by Geoff Johns and Leo Moder.

Paul Deisinger is an art teacher who was transformed into a paint-themed criminal and became a minion of Dragon King.

Paintball in other media
Paul Deisinger appears in Stargirl, portrayed by Randy Havens. This version is an art teacher at Blue Valley High School. Following a minor appearance in the episode "Summer School: Chapter Two", Deisinger appears in the episode "Summer School: Chapter Five", wherein Cindy Burman uses Eclipso to enchant Deisinger into painting until he becomes engulfed by a paint blob. When the Justice Society of America investigate, he causes them to see nightmares until Stargirl pulls him out of the paint blob, curing him of Eclipso's powers. Following this, Deisinger undergoes a psych evaluation. In the episode "Frenemies – Chapter Nine: The Monsters", he is killed by Lily Mahkent.

Jarrett Parker
Dr. Jarrett Parker is a therapist who practiced in Huntington, New York and a colleague of Dr. Owen Slade.

One of his patients was Chunk. After swallowing a matter transmitter and becoming a human singularity, Chunk became frustrated with Parker and sent him to another dimension. Here, Parker helped establish a community with others who suffered the same fate, including Karin Preus and Eric Gunderson. Parker's counsel remained ineffective on Chunk, and Chunk's frustration with this caused him to be absorbed into yet another dimension.

Jarrett Parker in other media
Dr. Jarrett Parker appears in two season seven episodes of Arrow, portrayed by Jason E. Kelley. This version is a corrupt chief psychiatrist in Level Two of Slabside Maximum Security Prison who performs unethical and even lethal methods in rehabilitating the most dangerous criminals. Prior to his job in prison, he had a patient named Robert Goodman who had a violent outbursts and promised to his parents to make him docile. His patient started to suffer from spontaneous bouts of amnesia and Robert lost own identity and was essentially erased. Other examples followed and Parker was accused for performing those methods on them but without a strong evidence. Debuting in "Level Two", Parker visits Oliver Queen who wants to find the individual named "The Demon". When Oliver tells him why he became vigilante Green Arrow, Parker repeatedly persuades him to give up his other identity and his violent inclinations. In "The Demon", Oliver discovers that "The Demon" is actually Talia al Ghul, who survived the explosion on Lian Yu island and was captured and put in the prison at some point. Oliver realises that Jarrett performs unethical and dangerous experimentations on the criminals. When Oliver and Talia hatch the plan to escape, they were taken to him. Oliver and Talia incapacitate him, take the evidence, and Oliver tells her to take the evidence to Felicity and her allies to expose his crimes and put Oliver on normal prison cell. After his crimes were exposed and he was fired, Parker is killed by Talia while loading his car.

Phantasm
Phantasm is the name of different characters appearing in American comic books published by DC Comics.

Phantasm I
The first Phantasm is a ghostly supervillain who fought Chris King and Vicki Grant. He was created by Robby Reed's Master form from the cell samples of an unidentified human, is a member of the Evil Eight, possesses ghost-like abilities, and can also summon demonic ghosts.

Danny Chase

Andrea Beaumont

Molly Pitcher
Molly Pitcher is a fictional character appearing in American comic books published by DC Comics.

In her panel seen within the pages of "The New Golden Age" #1, Molly Preacher is a school girl and the best friend of Betsy Rose. After seeing Miss America in action when their school was saved, they took on the costumed identities of Betsy Ross and Molly Pitcher to help her against a saboteur named Moth. On Molly's part, she received a pitcher that was associated with Betsy Ross from Miss America that can enable her to create weapons, create tools, and emit flash floods. Molly Pitcher and Betsy Ross were her sidekicks until the day when World War II ended where they mysteriously vanished. By the final issue of "Flashpoint Beyond", Molly Pitcher was among the thirteen missing Golden Age superheroes in the Time Masters' capsules. When those capsules have failed, they were all pulled back to their own time with history rebuilding around them.

Molly Pitcher and Betsy Ross are among the Lost Children on Childminder's island.

Pozhar 

Pozhar (Пожар or "Fire") is a Russian superhero in the DC Universe. The character, created by John Ostrander and Joe Brozowski, first appeared in The Fury of Firestorm (vol. 2) #62 (August 1987). Within the stories' context, Mikhail Arkadin is a nuclear technician who worked at the Chernobyl nuclear power generating plant. As a result of the accident at the plant's #4 reactor, he is imbued with the ability to convert matter into energy. He is recruited by Major Zastrow of the Red Shadow as one of the Soviet Union's official superheroes. A Russian victim of Chernobyl who acquired the ability to act as a living energy transformer, and has played a crucial role in the life of Firestorm.

Arkadin originally was an intellectual attached to the Chernobyl power plant, and was present during its catastrophe; his metagene was activated, and he gained the ability to create an all-consuming fire. Unfortunately, that same fire destroyed most of his body, and he was forced to wear a containment suit to prevent himself from destroying everything he touched. The Russian government then maneuvered him into position to be one of its premier heroes, placing him into a battle against the original Firestorm who was then calling for complete nuclear disarmament.

The battle raged for a time between the two heroes, until a nuclear weapon was dropped on the duo while they fought in the Nevada desert. From that debacle arose a new Firestorm, in which Mikhail played a crucial role, along with the original Firestorm's two members, Martin Stein and Ronnie Raymond. He continued as a member of Firestorm in another incarnation, as an Elemental, but was eventually removed from the Firestorm Matrix so that Martin alone could bear the powers. Ronnie and Mikhail returned to their respective homes depowered.

The "In My Father's House" storyline in the most recent Firestorm series revealed that Mikhail is, in fact, once again in control of his former abilities. He was re-powered by a nuclear test gone wrong in Russia. He was going by the name of Firestorm for a time despite now knowing that Firestorm was made up of Martin and Jason Rusch at the time, but he has now changed his super identity back to Pozhar.

In "The New 52" reboot of the DC Comics universe, Professor Mikhail Arkadin helped Professor Stein invent the Firestorm Protocols.

In the "Watchmen" sequel "Doomsday Clock", Pozhar appears as a member of the People's Heroes. He appears on TV announcing that Russia closing their borders to all foreigners, be they meta-human or not. During his interview on "The Superman Theory", Firestorm used a profanity to describe it and even used another profanity to insult Pozhar much to Martin's dismay.

Pozhar in other media
Mikhail Arkadin appears in the Legends of Tomorrow episodes "Fail Safe" and "White Knights", portrayed by Voytek Skrzeta. This version is a prison guard from 1986.

Valerie Perez

Neptune Perkins

Neptune Perkins is a superhero in the DC Universe.

The character, created by Gardner Fox and Joe Kubert, first appeared in Flash Comics #66 (August 1945). That and a follow up story in 1947 were the character's only appearances, until Roy Thomas revived him for an All-Star Squadron story in 1984 and later selected him as one of the focal characters of Young All-Stars in 1987. In addition, Thomas expanded the character's backstory and origin so that it incorporated large chunks of The Narrative of Arthur Gordon Pym of Nantucket by Edgar Allan Poe and Twenty Thousand Leagues Under the Sea by Jules Verne.

Within the context of the stories, Neptune Perkins is a mutant born with attributes that lend themselves to living at sea. During World War II he works with the All-Star Squadron. After the war he weds Miya Shimada, though this relationship becomes strained in part by his being unaware that he is not the father of their daughter, Debbie. In more recent years, he has acted as a governmental contact for Aquaman and Young Justice after being elected to the United States Senate. He is killed in Infinite Crisis #3 when the Shark and King Shark together attack and partially devour him during an undersea battle.

Peek-a-Boo
Peek-a-Boo (Lashawn Baez) is a DC Comics supervillain who first appeared in The Flash (vol. 2) #180, created by Geoff Johns and Scott Kolins.

Lashawn Baez was a graduate student at Central City Medical School, but put her studies aside to help her father Tomas when he got ill, requiring a kidney transplant. Lashawn tried to donate hers, but the procedure activated her latent metagene, granting her teleportation powers while in the same unable to donate her own organ because of her powers whenever she was touched.

As Peek-a-Boo, she snuck into Central City Hospital to steal a kidney, but accidentally destroyed a lab due to her powers being unstable and dangerous. The doctor grabbed her arm, which caused an implosion where she disappeared, nearly killing the surprised surgeon. The Flash and Cyborg intervened and defeated her with a wall of white sound generated by Cyborg's arm, coupled with disorientation from being teleported hundreds of times a second when the Flash deliberately triggered her powers. The Flash later returned the kidney to the hospital and Lashawn was convinced and sent to Iron Heights.

When Gorilla Grodd attacked Iron Heights, Peek-a-Boo was able to escape along with many other Rogues. She went to hospital to check on her father. Tomas Baez' doctors had been able to find a new kidney in time, but his ailing body rejected it and her father died. When the Flash came to the hospital, Lashawn, in grief and embittered by her incarceration, revealed to him that she wanted to be a hero like him whom she had idolised, but now considered him as an enemy. However, she later saved the life of the Flash's wife Linda Park when she was injured in a fight between them. Lashawn then turned herself in to the police believing she had nothing left to live for and remained in custody.

Peek-a-Boo in other media 
Peek-a-Boo (renamed Shawna Baez) appears in The Flash, portrayed by Britne Oldford. She debuts in the season 1 episode "Crazy for You", where she breaks into Iron Heights Prison to free her boyfriend Clay Parker. Her nickname is coined by Caitlin Snow from STAR Labs. After freeing her boyfriend, they get in a crime job with mob boss to rob a bank, but police arrest them, while Shawna and Clay escape. Barry is able to capture her after removing all the lights in a tunnel where she is unable to see in the dark and is put in S.T.A.R. Labs prison. She returns in "Rogue Air" as one of the prisoners being transferred to Lian Yu prison, but Leonard Snart frees the prisoners, hoping to call in a favor from them in the future. Shawna returns in the season 4 premiere "The Flash Reborn", where Wally West and Cisco Ramon coordinate their efforts to catch her during her latest crime spree. She later appears in the season 5 episode "Seeing Red" as one of the potential victims of metahuman serial killer the Cicada, with the Flash making arrangements to send her and other metahumans into witness protection to keep them safe.

Phosphorus Rex

Power Girl

Pozhar
Mikhail Arkadin is a Soviet superhero known as the Soviet Firestorm and Pozhar (Russian: пожар, "wildfire").

Mikhail Denisovitch Arkadin originally was an intellectual attached to the Chernobyl power plant, and was present during its catastrophe, gaining the ability to create fire. That same fire destroyed most of his body, and he was forced to wear a containment suit to prevent himself from destroying everything he touched. The Russian government then maneuvered him into position to be one of its premier heroes, placing him into a battle against the original Firestorm, who was then calling for complete nuclear disarmament.

The battle raged for a time between the two heroes, until a nuclear weapon was dropped on the duo while they fought in the Nevada desert. From that debacle arose a new Firestorm, in which Mikhail played a crucial role, along with the original two members of the Firestorm Matrix, Martin Stein and Ronnie Raymond. He continued as a member of Firestorm in another incarnation, as an Elemental, but was eventually removed from the Firestorm Matrix, with Martin alone keeping its powers.

During the "In My Father's House" storyline in the most recent Firestorm series, it was revealed that Mikhail is, in fact, once again in control of his former abilities. He was re-powered by a nuclear test gone wrong in Russia. After going by the name of Firestorm for a time (not knowing that a new Firestorm made up of Jason Rusch and Martin Stein had been in operation for some time), he has now changed his identity back to Pozhar.

In The New 52, a reboot of the DC Universe, Professor Mikhail Arkadin helped Professor Martin Stein invent the Firestorm Protocols.

In the Watchmen sequel Doomsday Clock, Pozhar appears as a member of the People's Heroes. He appears on TV, announcing that Russia is closing their borders to all foreigners, be they metahuman or not. During his interview on "the Superman Theory", Firestorm used a profanity to describe it and even used another profanity to insult Pozhar, much to the dismay of Martin Stein. Pozhar joined the People's Heroes in trying to catch Firestorm when he was accused of turning some Russians into glass. This causes Superman to come to Firestorm's defense, much to the dismay of Batman.

Pozhar in other media 
Mikhail Arkadin appears in Legends of Tomorrow, portrayed by Voytek Skrzeta. When the Legends infiltrate Luskavic Labs looking into Vandal Savage's Operation Svarog, Arkadin leads Soviet soldiers in capturing Martin Stein, Ray Palmer and Mick Rory and takes them to the Koshmar prison camp. At Koshmar, Arkadin tortures Palmer and Rory to get Stein to divulge his knowledge of Firestorm. When Jefferson Jackson cuts the circuit breaker to Koshmar, a prison riot breaks out. Arkadin attempts to contain the prisoners, but Leonard Snart pushes him into a cell with a prisoner named Boris, who proceeds to beat him up. He is killed when Valentina Vostok (as Firestorm) becomes unstable, causing a nuclear explosion at Koshmar.

Prankster

Preus
Preus is a fictional DC Comics supervillain who first appeared in Adventures of Superman #625 (April 2004) and was created by Joe Kelly and Talent Caldwell as part of their "Godfall" arc. 

For years, Sergeant Preus had proudly served the Citizen's Patrol Corps, a police force that kept the peace in Kandor under the Kryptonian banner of El, their "creator". Due to the compression of time, more than a century had passed inside the bottle city (compared to only a handful of years outside it) during which Preus and his fellow Kandorians had come to worship "The Superman" as their "god in heaven" above. The Corpsman was also a devout xenophobe, who dispensed justice against "non-K" (Kryptonian) dissidents that threatened their way of life, especially a citizen named Kal-El, who forever tainted Paradise when he seemingly murdered several Kandorians.

Preus swore a solemn oath to make the murderer pay, not realizing that Kal-El was actually the Superman that he and the others had worshiped for so long. He was also unaware that the "victims" were constructs created by an alien telepath, Lyla, who had brainwashed Kal-El into believing that Kandor was a never-exploded Krypton. Eventually shattering the illusion, Superman escaped Kandor and confronted Lyla back in Metropolis. Preus followed them, but exposure to Earth's air and yellow sun drastically affected him, giving him strange, new powers equal to Superman's while amplifying his already-unbalanced racist views.

Convinced that Kal-El had defiled the legacy of "The Superman", Preus swore to assume that responsibility himself and that all of the impure would die by his hand. His xenophobia led him to a group of white supremacists in the American desert, who he forced into worshiping him and his views. However, in time, the people of "God's Peake" (as the camp was called) came to worship Preus as their cult leader. His increasing prominence eventually led both the Martian Manhunter and Jimmy Olsen to investigate, only to have both of them captured by Preus and his men.

This forced a confrontation with Superman, who, at the time, was dealing with the effects of Gog's synthetic yellow kryptonite, which had significantly aged and weakened Superman in a short period of time. So weakened, Superman was barely able to deal with Preus' legions alone and quickly found himself outclassed by the (at the time) much more vital Preus.

A last-ditch gambit using kryptonite to try and weaken Preus failed, as Preus revealed a previously unknown resistance to kryptonite. He was finally defeated when Superman attacked and destroyed a key portion of Preus' armor, rendering him unconscious. Afterwards, Preus was injured from that attack and had to be hospitalized. His current whereabouts are unknown. He was last seen as a weakened Superman tried to fly him to S.T.A.R. Labs for treatment. Preus disappeared after Superman was engaged by an army of Gogs.

Powers and abilities of Preus 
Preus possesses powers similar to those of Superman, such as superhuman strength and speed, flight, invulnerability, X-ray vision and enhanced senses. Unlike Superman, Preus can fire beams of black energy from his eyes that strike a target with intense heat and force. Preus also does not share Superman's vulnerability to kryptonite.

In other media 
Preus appears in Krypton, portrayed by Ciaran Owens. This version is a Sagitari commander who leads a unit against the rebellion on the moon Wegthor during the second season. In "A Better Yesterday", he is presumably killed by Jax-Ur during negotiations between the rebel leaders and Primus Lyta-Zod.

Prestor Jon

Protector

Psiphon
In September 2011, The New 52 rebooted DC's continuity. In this new timeline, Psiphon is introduced to DC as a H.I.V.E. warrior who is paired up with the Dreadnought. He appears in Superboy (vol. 4) #20, where the team are dispatched to New York City to capture Doctor Psycho, who had escaped from a H.I.V.E. facility, and Superboy, whose psionic powers were of interest to the H.I.V.E. Despite proving to be formidable opponents, both Psiphon and the Dreadnought were defeated when Doctor Psycho and Superboy teamed up to take them down. Psiphon was knocked out by Superboy with just a flick of his finger.

Powers and abilities of Psiphon 
Having undergone genetic modifications by the H.I.V.E., Psiphon, as his name implies, has the ability to drain the energy of a psi-powered individual and feed it to the Dreadnought to increase his strength.

Puppeteer

The Puppeteer, originally known as the Puppet Master, is a DC Comics supervillain. Jordan Weir was a scientist who created a "hypno-ray" which he could use to force his victims to obey his commands. As the Puppet Master, he embarked on a crime spree, manipulating minor criminals into doing his dirty work.

After being defeated by Green Lantern, he started a new life as a scientist for Dayton Industries. However, when the company developed the self-generating power source known as Promethium, the temptation was too much for him. Through his robot puppets, the Puppeteer took control of Cyborg, Kid Flash, Starfire, and Wonder Girl and turned them against their teammates. Raven's soul-self was finally able to break their trance and the Titans united to battle the Puppeteer and his toy robotic army. When the villain was defeated, the H.I.V.E. attempted to destroy him for his failure, but the Puppeteer escaped.

The Puppeteer in other media 
 A character loosely inspired by the Puppet Master called the Dollman (not to be confused with Doll Man) appears in The Adventures of Batman episode "Beware of Living Dolls"
 A character inspired by the Puppeteer called the Puppet King appears in Teen Titans, voiced by Tracey Walter.
 The Puppeteer makes non-speaking background appearances in Justice League Unlimited as a member of Gorilla Grodd's Secret Society.

Purgatory
Purgatory is a supervillain in DC Comics.

Paul Christian is a man who lost his legs in a subway accident. Years later, he was almost injured during a battle involving Green Lantern V (Kyle Rayner). To make amends, Kyle used his power ring to give Paul new legs. Following another accident, it affected Paul's willpower, causing him to lose his legs.

During the Underworld Unleashed crossover event, Paul was desperate to get his legs back. He accepted the demon-lord Neron's offer to regain his legs and was given superpowers. As the green flame-emitting Purgatory, he was sent to kill Green Lantern V. After failing to do so in two attempts, Purgatory was taken to Hell by Neron while he was still alive.

Puzzler

The Puzzler is a name used by three supervillains in the DC Universe.

The Puzzler I 
The concept and original character, created by Jerry Siegel and John Sikela, first appeared in Action Comics #49 (June 1942). The concept was later revamped for the character Valerie Van Haaften.

Within the context of the mainstream comics, the original Puzzler is an unnamed non-costumed criminal who is highly skilled in parlor games and puzzles and operates a protection racket in Metropolis.

This character, along with most of the Golden Age Superman material, was later assigned to the universe of Earth-Two in the DC Multiverse. The material was later removed from DC continuity as a result of Crisis on Infinite Earths.

The Puzzler II 
The name of the Puzzler was re-used in Superman (vol. 2) #187 (December 2002) as the supervillain identity of Valerie van Haaften, a new version of the character whose body was composed of living "puzzle pieces". In the first appearance, as "Puzzler", she admits that she is a large fan of Superman's, and initially attempted to join several super groups to no avail. Thus, she decided that she would become a villain to gain his attention. Her body is composed of multiple large "puzzle pieces" that she can fully control, even when they are not directly attached to her. Superman disperses her with his super breath. 

The Puzzler reappeared Superman: Up, Up and Away! during the One Year Later story arc as an assassin hired by Intergang to kill Clark Kent. When she sees Superman, she decides to attempt to kill him instead to become famous. During the fight, she reveals she has been "upgraded" to have pieces that are nearly indestructible. Her "puzzle pieces" are much smaller and appear to be able to hit with greater force than her previous appearance. Superman defeats her again by trapping her component pieces in separate containers - preventing her from building up sufficient speed to escape.

The Puzzler III 
In September 2011, The New 52 rebooted DC's continuity. In this new timeline, a new character called the Puzzler under an alias of "Agent Evans" appears as a member of A.R.G.U.S. He is later revealed to be a descendant of Vandal Savage.

The Puzzler in other media 
 The Puzzler appears in the Batman consecutive episodes "The Puzzles Are Coming" and "The Duo Is Slumming", portrayed by Maurice Evans. Originally, the episodes were going to feature the Riddler (portrayed by Frank Gorshin) and were titled "A Penny for Your Riddles" and "They're Worth a Lot More" as such, but Gorshin was in the midst of a contract dispute with the series' producers as he no longer wanted to portray the Riddler.
 A male incarnation of the Puzzler dressed in Valerie van Haaften's outfit appears in Justice League Unlimited as a minor member of Gorilla Grodd's Secret Society.

Professor Pyg

Son of Pyg
Son of Pyg is a fictional character appearing in American comic books published by DC Comics.

Janosz Valentine is the son of Professor Pyg. Batwoman was investigating the murders of three marines that he killed on behalf of a group of Argentinian criminals.

Son of Pyg was revealed to be an operative of Leviathan who oversaw the initiation of Leviathan's recruits. He interrogates Stephanie Brown and Jolisa Windsor where he claims that one of them betrayed Saint Hadrian's Finishing School for Girls. When Son of Pyg threatens Jolisa, Stephanie frees herself and saves Jolisa. Both of them go on the run with Son of Pyg and the Leviathan girls in hot pursuit. As Stephanie as Batgirl gets Jolisa down to the courtyard, Son of Pyg catches up to them and gets knocked out by the gardener who turns out to be Batman in disguise.

References

 DC Comics characters: P, List of